The Golden Horse Award for Best Documentary Short Film is an award presented annually at the Golden Horse Awards by the Taipei Golden Horse Film Festival Executive Committee. The latest ceremony was held in 2022, with Huang Shuli winning the award for the film Will You Look at Me.

References

Golden Horse Film Awards